Batool Begam is a folk music singer from Jaipur in the Indian state of Rajasthan. She sings mand and bhajan songs and has become internationally famous.
She plays instruments such as the dhol, dholak and tabla. She was awarded the 2021 Nari Shakti Puruskar on International Women's Day in 2022.

References 

Musicians from Jaipur
Dhol players
Tabla players
Bhajan singers
Indian folk singers
Nari Shakti Puraskar winners
Women from Rajasthan
Year of birth missing (living people)
Living people